Cristina Guinea González (born 31 July 1992) is a Spanish field hockey midfielder who is part of the Spain women's national field hockey team.

She was part of the Spanish team at the 2016 Summer Olympics in Rio de Janeiro, where they finished eighth. On club level she plays for Júnior Fútbol Club in Spain. During the 2016/17 season she played for Der Club an der Alster in Hamburg, Germany.

References

External links
 

Cristina Guinea González Pictures and Photos - Getty Images

1992 births
Living people
Spanish female field hockey players
Olympic field hockey players of Spain
Field hockey players at the 2016 Summer Olympics
Place of birth missing (living people)
Female field hockey midfielders
Der Club an der Alster players
Feldhockey Bundesliga (Women's field hockey) players